Abdenour Belkheir (born 21 February 1989) is an Algerian professional footballer who plays as a forward.

International career
Belkheir made his senior debut with the Algeria national football team in a friendly 2-0 loss to Saudi Arabia on 9 May 2018.

References

External links
 
 
 DZFoot Profile

1989 births
Living people
People from Oran Province
Algerian footballers
Algeria international footballers
Association football forwards
CS Constantine players
JS Saoura players
USM Blida players
MC Alger players
Algerian Ligue Professionnelle 1 players
21st-century Algerian people